Trachylepis nancycoutuae, also known commonly as Nancy Coutu's mabuya and Nancy Coutu's skink, is a species of lizard in the family Scincidae. The species is endemic to Madagascar.

Etymology
The specific name, nancycoutuae, is in honor of American Peace Corps volunteer Nancy Coutu (1967–1996), who was murdered in Madagascar by cattle thieves.

Habitat

Reproduction
The mode of reproduction of T. nancycoutuae is unknown.

References

Further reading
Bauer AM (2003). "On the identity of Lacerta punctata Linnaeus 1758, the type species of the genus Euprepis Wagler 1830, and the generic assignment of Afro-Malagasy skinks". African Journal of Herpetology 52 (1): 1–7. (Trachylepis nancycoutuae, new combination).
Glaw F, Vences M (2006). A Field Guide to the Amphibians and Reptiles of Madagascar, Third Edition. Cologne, Germany: Vences & Glaw Verlag. 496 pp. .
Lima A, Harris DJ, Rocha S, Miralles A, Glaw F, Vences M (2013). "Phylogenetic relationships of Trachylepis skink species from Madagascar and the Seychelles (Squamata: Scincidae)". Molecular Phylogenetics and Evolution 67 (3): 615–620.
Mausfeld P, Schmitz A (2003). "Molecular phylogeography, intraspecific variation and speciation of the Asian scincid lizard genus Eutropis Fitzinger, 1843 (Squamata: Reptilia: Scincidae): taxonomic and biogeographic implications". Organisms Diversity & Evolution 3: 161–171. (Euprepis nancycoutuae, new combination).
Nussbaum RA, Raxwothy CJ (1998). "A New Species of Mabuya Fitzinger (Reptilia: Squamata: Scincidae) from the High Plateau (Isalo National Park) of South-Central Madagascar". Herpetologica 54 (3): 336–343. (Mabuya nancycoutuae, new species).

Trachylepis
Reptiles described in 1998
Taxa named by Ronald Archie Nussbaum
Taxa named by Christopher John Raxworthy